The NCHC Sportsmanship Award is an annual award given out at the conclusion of the National Collegiate Hockey Conference regular season to the best player best exemplifying the qualities of sportsmanship in the conference as voted by the coaches of each NCHC team.

The Sportsmanship Award was first awarded in 2014 and is a successor to the Terry Flanagan Memorial Award which was discontinued after the conference dissolved due to the 2013–14 NCAA conference realignment.

Award winners

Winners by school

Winners by position

See also
NCHC Awards
Terry Flanagan Memorial Award

References

External links

College ice hockey trophies and awards in the United States
NCHC